HelloFresh is a publicly traded meal kit company based in Berlin, Germany. It is the largest meal-kit provider in the United States, and also has operations in Australia, Canada, New Zealand, Europe (United Kingdom, Germany, Austria, Switzerland, Belgium, Netherlands, Luxembourg, France, Italy and Scandinavia) and Japan.

It has been listed on the Frankfurt Stock Exchange since its IPO in November 2017.

History 
HelloFresh was founded in November 2011 by Dominik Richter, Thomas Griesel, and Jessica Nilsson in Berlin, Germany. Richter and Griesel packed and hand-delivered to the first 10 customers. It was one of the earlier companies in the meal-kit industry. They were initially funded by Rocket Internet, a German startup studio company. They first started delivering meal kits to paying customers in early 2012, and expanded to the Netherlands, UK, US and Australia the same year. By 2014, the company claimed to be delivering 1 million meals per month. They raised $50 million in a 2014 funding round, after having raised $10 million in 2012 and $7 million in 2013.

By March 2015, the company had 250,000 subscribers, although it was still not profitable. In September of that year, it was valued at €2.6 billion in a funding round where it raised €75 million, making it a unicorn company. The company was still majority-owned by Rocket Internet at that time. It cancelled a planned IPO in November, due to concerns about the company's proposed value. It experienced significant growth during the year, with 530,000 subscribers by the end of October. It had 750,000 subscribers by July 2016, and 1.3 million by the third quarter of 2017.

In October 2017, the company announced a planned IPO on the Frankfurt Stock Exchange to raise $350 million. On November 2, the company completed its IPO, valuing it at €1.7 billion. At the time of its IPO, the company had a market capitalization of more than double Blue Apron, its largest US-based competitor.

In March 2018, HelloFresh acquired Green Chef, a US organic meal-kit company.

In October 2018, Toronto-based HelloFresh Canada acquired Chefs Plate, a Canadian meal-kit company.

In 2019, Rocket Internet sold its remaining stake in HelloFresh by accelerated book building to international institutional investors. Rocket Internet had held a 30.6% stake in HelloFresh, as of the end of 2018.

On 17 Novermber 2022, HelloFresh launched in Spain under the name HelloFresh SE, promising to use "100 percent Spanish raised beef, chicken and pork." The following year, they announced that they would cease importing coconut milk from Thailand, following an investigation by People for the Ethical Treatment of Animals which accused Thai farmers of forcing southern pig-tailed macaques to harvest coconuts.

Business 
HelloFresh's business model is to prepare the ingredients needed for a meal, and deliver them to customers, who must then cook the meal using recipe cards, which can take around 30–40 minutes. It generally provides about three two-person meals a week for about $60 to $70. It offers a choice from about 19 recipes. In several markets, HelloFresh provides "Rapid Box" meals which take only 20 minutes to prepare.

In the United States, HelloFresh offers a wine-subscription service, based on that of its competitor Blue Apron. This subscription, HelloFresh Wine Club starts at $14.83 per bottle or $89 for the whole month (includes 6 bottles of wine). With the Wine Club, customers can also pick between All Reds, All White, or a Mixed Box (Red and White) for their wine.

In March 2018, HelloFresh announced their acquisition of Green Chef, a USDA-certified organic meal kit company. HelloFresh planned to use the acquisition to offer the largest selection of meal plans and diets for consumers on the market, adding Green Chef's organic vegan and gluten-free menus, including those plans compliant with Paleo and Keto diets.

The company's US operations were responsible for 60% of revenues as of November 2017, and it has approximately 44% of the American market. HelloFresh has operations in the United States, Canada, United Kingdom, Australia, Germany, Austria, Switzerland, the Netherlands, Belgium, Luxembourg, Sweden, Norway, Denmark, France, Italy, New Zealand, Japan, Spain and Ireland.

Union drive 
Warehouse workers for HelloFresh in Aurora, Colorado, and Richmond, California, initiated a union drive with UNITE-HERE in September 2021. HelloFresh management responded by hiring Kulture Consulting, a "union avoidance" consulting firm. Workers were compelled to attend captive audience meetings with anti-union messages. The Aurora election was held on November 22, and Richmond held its election on December 15; workers in both places voted decisively against unionization amid accusations of the company's interference and intimidation in the campaign, with the union contesting the results in Aurora. In Newark and Totowa, New Jersey, HelloFresh workers are unionizing with Brotherhood of Amalgamated Trades.

Climate labeling 
In November of 2021, HelloFresh launched their Climate Labeling Initiative. This labeling is to let consumers know when recipes are producing up to 85% less COe emissions. The initial launch was in Germany, but as of December 19, 2022, the label is available in eight other EU countries alongside Australia and New Zealand.

References

External links

US website

Food and drink companies of Germany
German companies established in 2011
Retail companies established in 2011
Transport companies established in 2011
Internet properties established in 2011
Food and drink companies based in Berlin
Companies listed on the Frankfurt Stock Exchange
Online food ordering
Online retailers of Germany
2017 initial public offerings
Rocket Internet
Subscription services
Software companies of Germany
Companies in the MDAX